David Flynn is a Gaelic footballer from Clonown in County Roscommon. He was captain of the 2006 All-Ireland Minor Football Championship winning team. He plays with the Clann na nGael club.

References

1988 births
Living people
Clan na Gael (Roscommon) Gaelic footballers
Roscommon inter-county Gaelic footballers